"Lift Me Up" is a song by the progressive rock band Yes. It was the first single released from their 1991 "reunion" album Union. It reached the number-one spot on the Billboard Album Rock Tracks chart in May 1991, and stayed in this position for six weeks. It also charted on the Billboard Hot 100, their last single to do so.

Background 
Following Yes's 1987–88 tour to support the Big Generator album, singer Jon Anderson left the band and formed a new group with 1970s-era Yes members Steve Howe (guitars), Rick Wakeman (keyboards) and Bill Bruford (drums). As their new band Anderson Bruford Wakeman Howe, the quartet released a self-titled album and went on tour.

Meanwhile, the remaining members of the "official" Yes, guitarist Trevor Rabin, bassist Chris Squire, drummer Alan White and keyboardist Tony Kaye, continued work on a follow-up to Big Generator.
Among the songs recorded was the Rabin- and Squire-penned "Lift Me Up", the lyrics of which allude to homelessness:

The two competing bands had fought for the rights to use the "Yes" name, with the Squire/Rabin/White/Kaye faction filing suit to prevent Anderson Bruford Wakeman Howe from using the name "Yes" during their tour promotion. However, once both factions were signed to Arista Records, the record label decided to combine the musicians' efforts and produce an album, Union, featuring songs from each group. "Lift Me Up" was one of four Rabin or Squire songs included on the album; its follow-up single, "Saving My Heart", was another.

Chart performance 
"Lift Me Up" spent six weeks at the number one spot, from May 4 to June 8, 1991.
It also charted on the Billboard Hot 100 chart, where it reached number 86.

References 

Yes (band) songs
1991 singles
Songs written by Trevor Rabin
Songs written by Chris Squire
1991 songs
Arista Records singles